In Command may refer to:
 In Command (album), a 1996 live album by Annihilator
 In Command (horse), a racehorse
 "In Command" (song), a 1993 song by Rob'n'Raz